A penumbral lunar eclipse took place on Saturday, September 15, 1951. This subtle penumbral eclipse may have been visible to a skilled observer at maximum eclipse. 80% of the Moon's disc was partially shaded by the Earth (none of it was in total shadow), which caused a gentle shadow gradient across its disc at maximum; the eclipse as a whole lasted 3 hours and 55 minutes.

Visibility

Related lunar eclipses

Lunar year series

See also
List of lunar eclipses
List of 20th-century lunar eclipses

Notes

External links

1951-09
1951 in science